Kim Ji-yeong (born 1976) is a South Korean voice actress who joined the Munhwa Broadcasting Corporation's Voice Acting Division in 1999.

Roles

Broadcast TV
E-Mark (narration, MBC) 
Magical DoReMi (Korea TV Edition, MBC)
Digimon Frontier (Korea TV Edition, Tooniverse)
Atlantis King (MBC)
Fairy Adventure (MBC)

Movie dubbing
Creyon Shin Chan (Movie, Korea TV Edition, MBC)
I Still Know What You Did Last Summer (replacing Karla Wilson, Korea TV Edition, MBC)
Bring It On (replacing Gabrielle Union, Korea TV Edition, MBC)
Star Wars: Episode I – The Phantom Menace, (replacing Natalie Portman, Korea TV Edition, MBC)
''True Lies (replacing Eliza Dushku, Korea TV Edition, MBC)

See also
Munhwa Broadcasting Corporation
MBC Voice Acting Division

External links
 MBC Voice Acting Division Kim Ji-yeong Blog

Living people
South Korean voice actresses
1976 births
20th-century South Korean actresses
21st-century South Korean actresses